Joe Salem (born 29 September 1960) is a Lebanese sports shooter. He competed in the men's trap event at the 2000 Summer Olympics.

References

External links
 

1960 births
Living people
Lebanese male sport shooters
Olympic shooters of Lebanon
Shooters at the 2000 Summer Olympics
Sportspeople from Beirut
Asian Games silver medalists for Lebanon
Asian Games bronze medalists for Lebanon
Asian Games medalists in shooting
Shooters at the 1998 Asian Games
Shooters at the 2002 Asian Games
Shooters at the 2006 Asian Games
Shooters at the 2010 Asian Games
Shooters at the 2014 Asian Games
Medalists at the 2006 Asian Games
Medalists at the 2010 Asian Games
20th-century Lebanese people
21st-century Lebanese people